Highway 912 is a provincial highway in the north-east region of the Canadian province of Saskatchewan. It runs from Highway 913 near Narrow Hills Provincial Park to a dead end just within the borders of the Lac La Ronge Provincial Park.

See also 
Roads in Saskatchewan
Transportation in Saskatchewan

References 

912